Bang Shang a Lang (BSL) are an Australian pub rock band. Four members were in other bands in the local music scene from the late 1970s through to the 1990s. Murray Cook on guitar and vocals and Mark Mulligan on guitar and lead vocals were previously members of Finger Guns in 1986, which issued a single, "Heartman Is Breathing", in that year. Bruce Carter, on drums, and Cook were both members of the Transistors. Keyboard player, Richard Stevens, hails from Leeds, England. Clyde Bramley, their bass guitarist, was a member of the Hitmen (1978), the New Christs (1980–81), the Angie Pepper Band (ca. 1982) and Hoodoo Gurus (1982–88).

Cook co-founded a children's music group, the Wiggles, in 1991. After the Wiggles formed, Cook would periodically play with Bang Shang a Lang when available. In mid-2000 Mark Alchin joined the group on bass guitar (ex-the Transistors, the Clones). BSL released a CD, Unreal, Orange Peel!, in 2006. Of its eleven tracks, four are originals written by Mulligan and seven are cover versions. By 2012 the line-up of Bang Shang a Lang was Bramley, Carter, Cook and Mulligan.

Personnel

 Clyde Bramley – bass guitar, vocals
 Bruce Carter – drums, vocals
 Murray Cook – guitar, vocals
 Mark Mulligan – guitar, lead vocals
 Richard Stevens – keyboards, vocals
 Mark Alchin – bass guitar

References

External links

 

Australian rock music groups
Musical groups from Sydney